High mobility group protein B4 is a transcription factor that in humans is encoded by the HMGB4 gene.

See also 
 High-mobility group

References

Further reading

Transcription factors